The 1986–87 Northern Premier League season was the 19th in the history of the Northern Premier League, a football competition in England.
It was the last Northern Premier League season, consisting of a single division, as before the next season 19 clubs joined the league and formed a new Division One.

Overview
The League featured twenty-two clubs.

Team changes
The following club left the League at the end of the previous season:
Gateshead promoted to Football Conference

The following club joined the League at the start of the season:
Barrow relegated from Alliance Premier League

League table

Results

Cup Results
Challenge Cup:

Macclesfield Town bt. Burton Albion

President's Cup:

Macclesfield Town 2–1 Marine

Northern Premier League Shield: Between Champions of NPL Premier Division and Winners of the NPL Cup.

Bangor City1 bt. Macclesfield Town

1 As Macclesfield Town won both the Northern Premier League and the Presidents cup, Bangor City qualified as 2nd placed team of the NPL.

End of the season
At the end of the nineteenth season of the Northern Premier League,  Macclesfield Town applied to join the Football Conference and were successful.

Promotion and relegation
The following two clubs left the League at the end of the season:
Macclesfield Town promoted to Football Conference
Burton Albion transferred to Southern League Premier Division

The following two clubs joined the League the following season:
Frickley Athletic relegated from Football Conference
Gateshead relegated from Football Conference

From the next season, the Northern Premier League was expanded to include a Division One, with 19 clubs.

External links
 Northern Premier League Tables at RSSSF

Northern Premier League seasons
6